The Stickeen brown bear (Ursus arctos stikeenensis), also known as Stikine brown bear, is a large North American brown bear that is most commonly dark brown in color but can also range from blonde to black, featuring a distinctive hump on its shoulders and a slightly dished profile to the face.

Description
However, the size varies depending upon the amount of food.

References

Grizzly bears
Mammals of North America
Mammals described in 1914